Diego Agüero (born 10 February 1984) is a Paraguayan footballer currently playing for Sportivo Luqueño of the Primera Division in Paraguay.

Teams
  Independiente F.B.C. 2000–2005
  Deportes Antofagasta 2006–2007
  ESPOLI 2008–2010
  Sportivo Luqueño 2011–present

External links
 

1984 births
Living people
Paraguayan footballers
Paraguayan expatriate footballers
Paraguay international footballers
Independiente F.B.C. footballers
Sportivo Luqueño players
C.D. ESPOLI footballers
C.D. Antofagasta footballers
Expatriate footballers in Chile
Expatriate footballers in Ecuador
Association football midfielders